The women's big air competition of the 2018 Winter Olympics was held on 19 and 22 February 2018 at the Alpensia Ski Jumping Stadium in Pyeongchang, South Korea. The event made its Olympic debut.

Qualification

The top 30 athletes in the Olympic quota allocation list qualified (for both big air and slopestyle, the rankings were combined). This meant only a maximum of 30 could qualify across both events. A maximum of four athletes per National Olympic Committee (NOC) was allowed. All athletes qualifying must also have placed in the top 30 of a FIS World Cup event (in either big air or slopestyle) or the FIS Freestyle Ski and Snowboarding World Championships 2017 during the qualification period (1 July 2016 to 21 January  2018) and also have a minimum of 50 FIS points to compete. If the host country, South Korea at the 2018 Winter Olympics did not qualify, their chosen athlete would displace the last qualified athlete, granted all qualification criterion was met.

Qualification
 Q — Qualified for the Final

The top 12 athletes in the qualifiers moved on to the medal round.

Final
The final was held on 22 February 2018.

References

Women's snowboarding at the 2018 Winter Olympics